David Gobejishvili (born 3 January 1963) is a former Soviet (Georgian) wrestler and Olympic champion in Freestyle wrestling.

References 
 
 Georgian Olympic committee

1963 births
Living people
Sportspeople from Kutaisi
Soviet male sport wrestlers
Olympic wrestlers of the Soviet Union
Olympic wrestlers of the Unified Team
Wrestlers at the 1988 Summer Olympics
Wrestlers at the 1992 Summer Olympics
Male sport wrestlers from Georgia (country)
Olympic gold medalists for the Soviet Union
Olympic bronze medalists for the Unified Team
Olympic medalists in wrestling
World Wrestling Championships medalists
Medalists at the 1992 Summer Olympics
Medalists at the 1988 Summer Olympics
Honoured Masters of Sport of the USSR

Recipients of the Presidential Order of Excellence